Three submarines of the Royal Norwegian Navy have borne the name HNoMS Ula, after the village of Ula in Norway.
  was a U-class submarine launched in 1943 and scrapped in 1965.
  was a Kobben-class submarine launched in 1964, and scrapped in 1998.
  is an Ula-class submarine launched in 1988.

References

Royal Norwegian Navy ship names